Iecea Mare is a commune in Timiș County, Romania. It is composed of a single village, Iecea Mare, and was part of the commune of Cărpiniș until 2004, when it was split off.

History 
The first recorded mention of a settlement named Uche dates from 1317. This settlement existed throughout the Middle Ages, as shown by numerous medieval documents reminiscent of Wche (1417), Ewcze (1467), Eqche (1479). After the expulsion of the Turks from Banat, one cannot speak of a settlement, but there was the Jetsa estate, as shown by Count Mercy's map of 1723.

Today's village was founded in 1767 by Councilor , who brought here German settlers from Lorraine, Luxembourg, Trier, Bavaria, etc. for whom he built 202 houses. The Germans named some areas of the village and the streets after their origin. Thus, there were Österreich ("Austria") and Haszrundel areas and Luxembourg, Trier, Bakowa, Kirchen, Nei, Periam, Lefelstadt, Yeger, Schwarzwald ("Black Forest") and Letzte ("last arrived") streets. In 1779 the name Gross Jetscha ("Great Iecea") also appears, and the locality is assigned to Torontál County. In 1836 there is a cholera epidemic that kills about 100 locals.

Demographics 

Iecea Mare had a population of 2,231 inhabitants at the 2011 census, down 4% from the 2002 census. Most inhabitants are Romanians (84.18%), with a minority of Roma (5.24%). For 9.73% of the population, ethnicity is unknown. By religion, most inhabitants are Orthodox (74.9%), but there are also minorities of Pentecostals (5.87%), Roman Catholics (5.06%), Adventists (2.24%) and Greek Catholics (1.88%). For 9.73% of the population, religious affiliation is unknown.

References 

Communes in Timiș County
Localities in Romanian Banat
2004 establishments in Romania